Kelp is seaweed.

Kelp may also refer to:
 Kelp Records, music label
 KELP, El Paso International Airport ICAO code
 Kelp Harbour, Falkland Islands
 Broadcasting stations
 KELP (AM)
 KELP-FM
 Kelp annotation framework, a computer source code annotation framework